Zatsepnoye is a rural locality (a khutor) in Zemlyanskoye Rural Settlement, Semiluksky District, Voronezh Oblast, Russia. The population was 65 as of 2010.

Geography 
Zatsepnoye is located 40 km northwest of Semiluki (the district's administrative centre) by road. Zemlyansk is the nearest rural locality.

References 

Rural localities in Semiluksky District